EPM may refer to:

Management 
 Enterprise performance management
 Enterprise project management
 Elsevier performance manager

Education 
 École Polytechnique de Montréal, now Polytechnique Montréal, an engineering school in Canada
 Escola Portuguesa de Moçambique, a Portuguese school in Maputo, Mozambique
 Macau Portuguese School

Science and technology 
 Electronic protective measures
 Electropermanent magnet
 Elevated plus maze, a rodent-based model of anxiety
 Equine protozoal myeloencephalitis
 Ethylene propylene rubber
 European Physiology Modules, an International Space Station payload
 Evolved psychological mechanism
 Electropositive metal, in electropositive shark repellent

Other uses 
 EPM (cycling team), a Colombian cycling team
 European power metal, a sub-genre of power metal
 Extreme Power Metal, an album by power metal band DragonForce
 Eastport Municipal Airport, in Maine, United States
 Empresas Públicas de Medellín, a Colombian public utility
 An Enquiry Concerning the Principles of Morals, a 1751 book by Scottish philosopher David Hume
 EPM Musique, a French record label
 European Peace Marches
 Macau Prison
 Pyrenees–Mediterranean Euroregion